The 2009–10 Australian cricket season consists of international matches played by the Australian cricket team in Australia as well as Australian domestic cricket matches under the auspices of Cricket Australia.

Australian Cricket Team

West Indies will tour Australia between November and February in a three-Test tour as well as ODIs and Twenty-20 matches.

Pakistan will tour Australia between December and February in a three-Test tour as well as ODIs and Twenty-20 matches.

New Zealand women will tour Australia in February 2010 for ODI and Twenty-20 series.

Sheffield Shield

The Sheffield Shield will open on 13 October 2009 with matches between South Australia and Tasmania in Adelaide and Western Australia and Queensland in Perth.

One Day Domestic

The Ford Ranger One Day Cup will open on 11 October 2009 with a match between Western Australia and Queensland at the WACA Ground.

Twenty20 Domestic

The KFC Twenty20 Big Bash will open on 28 December 2009 with a match between Queensland and Victoria.

References

 
2009 in cricket
2010 in cricket